Frating is a village and small civil parish of the Tendring district of Essex, England. The parish includes the settlements of Frating Green and Hockley.

The parish church (dedication not recorded) is now a private house. The living was a rectory shared with Thorrington.

The village hall is the Frating War Memorial Hall and Institute which celebrated its 100th Anniversary in September 2022.  

Great Bentley rail station is two miles away and is served by Abellio Greater Anglia services to Colchester, Walton-on-the-Naze, London Liverpool Street and Clacton-on-Sea.

There is one public house; The Kings Arms.

Bus services

Nearby places

References

External links

Frating Parish Council website
Extract from History, Gazetteer, and Directory of the County of Essex by William White published in 1848

Villages in Essex
Civil parishes in Essex
Tendring